Aline Waites is an English actress, director, producer, reviewer and writer.

Life and career 

Aline Waites was born in Kingston upon Hull, educated at Froebel House School, and studied for the theatre at Webber Douglas Academy. Before her grown-up training, she was already skilled in dancing, singing and modelling and had written a prize-winning comedy.

On graduation she won the Silver Medal and a BBC contract, and at the BBC was lucky to work with famous actors of the day, including John Gielgud to whose Ernest Worthing she played Cecily in The Importance of Being Earnest. She played Gwen, the daughter of Mrs Dale for many years in the BBC's famous fictional diarist in Mrs Dale's Diary, later known as The Dales. Her mother was first Ellis Powell and later Jessie Matthews. Latterly, single-again Gwen took increased prominence as the parental characters aged, with her choice of new husband a major cliff-hanger just before the serial ended.

As a stage actress, Aline Waites did many tours and seasons, including Rep at Torquay, Bournemouth, Southampton and Bangor in Northern Ireland. Favourite roles were Marilyn Monroe in The White Whore, Jane Eyre and Melanie in Gone with the Wind 2.

On television she debuted as Lottie in The Puppet Master, a live transmission in 1956. She played Nurse Joan Edwards in Emergency Ward 10, and was in A Life of Bliss and other drama productions.

She started Aba Daba Music Hall, the first fully professional pub theatre company, at the Mother Redcap, Camden Town, and from 1970 at the Pindar of Wakefield Theatre in Gray's Inn Road. This venue (now the Water Rats) was purpose built for the company. In 1980 she produced a political twice nightly revue for Kennedy's in the Kings Road called Downstairs at Kennedy's. A new project at Underneath The Arches in Southwark, begun in 1991, continued until 1996.  The music hall performances were at first traditional, but soon became well known for their radical nature.

Her life partner for many years was Robin Hunter.  With him she created political pantomimes each year for the Pindar, The Arches and the Canal Cafe Theatre. Together they wrote twenty five shows. With Robin Hunter and John Gould she wrote Hit the Fan or Not the News Revue, performed at the Canal Cafe.

She wrote Stairway to Paradise, a musical biography of Marilyn Monroe, with music arranged by David Wykes, which was performed at The Arches and the Canal Cafe.
She has organised big charity performances at venues including The Old Vic, the Shaftesbury Theatre, the May Fair Theatre and Charing Cross Music Hall – also shows in Scandinavia, France, Germany, Canada, and the USA.

Her company did three summer seasons in Copenhagen, and toured major cities in Denmark many times throughout the seventies.

Presentations included Gone with the Wind 2 (nineteen productions in various venues) and Road to Casablanca, which were written with Robin Hunter and David Kelsey. Fanny's Revenge with music by Jeff Clarke and Death on the Isle – music by Antony Feldman – were Waites/Hunter musical comedies.

Non-music theatre was represented by her production of Pinter's The Birthday Party for a tour of Denmark.

She has also written comedy sketches for the younger generation, including the Brighton Revue Company.

She co-wrote, with Robin Hunter and David Wykes, The Illustrated Victorian Songbook, Michael Joseph 1985. Her novel A Thing Called Joe was published in 2016, quickly followed by the next book She That Plays the Queen.  Other writing projects, both books and plays, are in preparation.
  
As a director of plays, her productions include Waiting in the Wings, Noël Coward's play set in an actress's retirement home – with a cast of eighteen on a small stage – as well as Coward's Still Life and Red Peppers.
Aline Waites has been a reviewer and interviewer for Plays and Players national theatre magazine, and other journals. She now reviews for the Ham and High (the Hampstead and Highgate Express), for Remotegoat, and elsewhere. She took a BA hons lit degree from the Open University in 2005.

She was for several years on the North West Branch Committee of Equity.  She is also a member of Writers and Artists, Actors' Benevolent Fund, Writers' Guild of Great Britain and Musical Theatre Network.

References

Sources 

 Radio Times Archive, BBC Caversham
 Theatre World Annual ed by Frances Stephens, pub Rockliff, London, successive years
 The Stage Yearbook pub Carson & Comerford, London, successive years
 Radio Times Annual pub BBC 1956, pp 44–47: Round the Dale Country 
 Mrs Dale's Diary: Gwen's Love Story pub Chambers, London & Edinburgh, and  BBC 1961
 The Illustrated Victorian Songbook by Hunter, Waites & Wykes, pub Michael Joseph 1985

External links 

 

Year of birth missing (living people)
Living people
Actresses from Kingston upon Hull
20th-century English actresses
English directors
English radio actresses
English musical theatre actresses
English stage actresses
English television actresses
Alumni of the Webber Douglas Academy of Dramatic Art